William Singleton may refer to:
 William Singleton (politician) (died 1677), English politician
 William Dean Singleton, American newspaper executive
 William Henry Singleton, American slave, Union soldier and minister

See also
 Billy Singleton, American basketball player